The 2006–07 Israeli Premier League season began on 26 August 2006. It was scheduled to begin a week before, but was then postponed due to the 2006 Lebanon War. Beitar Jerusalem, under businessman Arcadi Gaydamak, became the league champions.

Two teams from Liga Leumit were promoted at the end of the previous season: Maccabi Herzliya and Hakoah Amidar Ramat Gan. The two teams relegated were Hapoel Nazareth Illit and Bnei Sakhnin.

Teams and Locations

Twelve teams took part in the 2006-07 Israeli Premier League season, including ten teams from the 2005-06 season, as well as two teams which were promoted from the 2005-06 Liga Leumit.

Maccabi Herzliya were promoted as champions of the 2005-06 Liga Leumit. Hakoah Amidar Ramat Gan were promoted as runners up. Maccabi Herzliya and Hakoah Amidar Ramat Gan returned to the top flight after an absence of six and twenty seven seasons respectively.

Hapoel Nazareth Illit and Bnei Sakhnin were relegated after finishing in the bottom two places in the 2005-06 season.

Final table

Results

First and second round

Third round

Goals

Top goal scorers

Goals in a Game
Individual 4, joint record:
 Elyaniv Barda, Hapoel Tel Aviv 4-3 over Hakoah Amidar Ramat Gan
 Shlomi Arbeitman, Maccabi Haifa 6-1 over Hapoel Petah Tikva

Game 8, Hakoah Amidar Ramat Gan 4-4 F.C. Ashdod

Other Statistics

Attendance
Seasons highest around 20,000, 3 times:
 Maccabi Tel Aviv versus Beitar Jerusalem, Teddy Stadium, Jerusalem
 Hapoel Tel Aviv versus Beitar Jerusalem, Teddy Stadium, Jerusalem
 Maccabi Haifa versus Beitar Jerusalem, Teddy Stadium, Jerusalem

Streaks
Longest unbeaten run, Maccabi Tel Aviv, 20 matches
Longest losing run, Hakoah Amidar Ramat Gan, 13 matches

See also
2006–07 Toto Cup Al

References
 2006–07 Israeli Premier League, The Israel Football Association
Israel 2006/07 RSSSF

 

Israeli Premier League seasons
Israel
1